The Tinajas Altas Mountains (O'odham: Uʼuva:k or Uʼuv Oopad) are an extremely arid northwest–southeast trending mountain range in southern Yuma County, Arizona, approximately 35 mi southeast of Yuma, Arizona. The southern end of the range extends approximately one mile into the northwestern Mexican state of Sonora on the northern perimeter of the Gran Desierto de Altar. The range is about 22 mi in length and about 4 mi wide at its widest point. Aside from the portion of the range in Mexico, the entirety of the range lies within the Barry M. Goldwater Air Force Range. They lie at the heart of the traditional homeland of the Hia C-eḍ O'odham people.

Geology and geography
Geologically, the Tinajas Altas Mountains are a southeastward extension of the block faulted Gila Mountains, and what are now the Tinajas Altas Mountains were actually considered part of the Gila Mountains until about the middle of the 20th century. The two ranges are separated by Cipriano Pass, also referred to as "Smugglers Pass," about two miles northwest of Raven Butte,  which is a notable dark-colored volcanic feature on the eastern flank of the otherwise light-colored granitic range.

The range is named for the Tinajas Altas ("High Tanks"), which are a series of perched waterholes on the range's eastern side approximately four miles north of the international boundary. The waterholes figured prominently in the history of the area as they were for many years the only reliable source of water for many miles. Native Americans, principally the Hia C-eḍ O'odham, also utilized the waterholes as an important camp prior to European settlement.

The range lies in the Lower Colorado subdivision of the Sonoran Desert. This subdivision is sometimes referred to as the Colorado Desert and encompasses much of southeastern California, southwestern Arizona, northwestern Sonora, and northeastern Baja California. The subdivision is characterized by minimal precipitation, and the area around the Tinajas Altas Mountains averages only about three inches of rainfall per year.

Mexican topographic maps and United States Geological Survey (USGS) maps of the region disagree on the name of an adjacent range lying to the southeast of the Tinajas Altas Mountains. In the United States this small range is referred to as the Sierra de la Lechuguilla, but in Mexico they are called the Sierra Tinajas Altas which would suggest that they are a longer extension of the Tinajas Altas Mountains into Mexico. The two ranges, however, share no surface connection so they are not the same. The Sierra de la Lechuguilla/Sierra Tinajas Altas range are instead on a parallel alignment to the southeast of the Tinajas Altas Mountains proper.

The closest community to the Tinajas Altas Mountains is Fortuna Foothills in the east of the Yuma Valley adjacent to the Gila Mountains.

Ecology
The Tinajas Altas Mountains exhibit a variety of flora and fauna species. Among the notable flora present is the elephant tree, (Bursera microphylla), which species exhibits a contorted multi-furcate architecture.

See also
 Cabeza Prieta Mountains
 El Pinacate y Gran Desierto de Altar Biosphere Reserve
 Lechuguilla Desert
 List of LCRV Wilderness Areas (Colorado River)
 List of mountain ranges of Arizona
 List of mountain ranges of Yuma County, Arizona
 Pinacate Peaks
 Sierra Pinta
 Tinajas Altas (High Tanks)
 Tule Desert (Arizona)
 Valley and range sequence-Southern Yuma County
 Yuma Desert

References

Further reading
 Border Patrol: Along the Devil's Highway
 Cabeza Prieta National Wildlife Refuge
 Cabeza Prieta National Wildlife Refuge - Arizona
 Vehicle Trails Associated with Illegal Border Activities on Cabeza Prieta National Wildlife Refuge – July 2011

History of Yuma County, Arizona
Mountain ranges of Arizona
Mountain ranges of the Lower Colorado River Valley
Mountain ranges of the Sonoran Desert
Mountain ranges of Yuma County, Arizona
Mountain ranges of Mexico
Landforms of Sonora